Sagitta is a dim but distinctive constellation in the northern sky. Its name is Latin for 'arrow', not to be confused with the significantly larger constellation Sagittarius 'the archer'. It was included among the 48 constellations listed by the 2nd-century astronomer Ptolemy, and it remains one of the 88 modern constellations defined by the International Astronomical Union. Although it dates to antiquity, Sagitta has no star brighter than 3rd magnitude and has the third-smallest area of any constellation.

Gamma Sagittae is the constellation's brightest star, with an apparent magnitude of 3.47. It is an aging red giant star 90% as massive as the Sun that has cooled and expanded to a diameter 54 times greater than it. Delta, Epsilon, Zeta, and Theta Sagittae are each multiple stars whose components can be seen in small telescopes. V Sagittae is a cataclysmic variable—a binary star system composed of a white dwarf accreting mass of a donor star that is expected to go nova and briefly become the most luminous star in the Milky Way and one of the brightest stars in our sky around the year 2083. Two star systems in Sagitta are known to have Jupiter-like planets, while a third—15 Sagittae—has a brown dwarf companion.

History

The ancient Greeks called Sagitta  'the arrow', and it was one of the 48 constellations described by Ptolemy. It was regarded as the weapon that Hercules used to kill the eagle of Jove that perpetually gnawed Prometheus' liver. Sagitta is located beyond the north border of Aquila, the Eagle. An amateur naturalist, polymath Richard Hinckley Allen proposed that the constellation could represent the arrow shot by Hercules towards the adjacent Stymphalian birds (which feature in Hercules' sixth labour) who had claws, beaks, and wings of iron, and who lived on human flesh in the marshes of Arcadia—denoted in the sky by the constellations Aquila the Eagle, Cygnus 'the Swan', and Lyra 'the Vulture'—and still lying between them, whence the title Herculea. Greek scholar Eratosthenes claimed it as the arrow with which Apollo exterminated the Cyclopes. The Romans named it Sagitta. In Arabic, it became al-sahm 'arrow', though this name became Sham and was transferred to Alpha Sagittae only. The Greek name has also been mistranslated as  'the loom' and thus in Arabic al-nawl. It was also called al-'anaza 'pike/javelin'.

Characteristics 
The four brightest stars make up an arrow-shaped asterism located due north of the bright star Altair. Covering 79.9 square degrees and hence 0.194% of the sky, Sagitta ranks 86th of the 88 modern constellations by area. Only Equuleus and Crux are smaller. Sagitta is most readily observed from the late spring to early autumn to northern hemisphere observers, with midnight culmination occurring on 17 July. Its position in the Northern Celestial Hemisphere means that the whole constellation is visible to observers north of 69°S. Sagitta is bordered by Vulpecula to the north, Hercules to the west, Aquila to the south, and Delphinus to the east. The three-letter abbreviation for the constellation, as adopted by the International Astronomical Union in 1922, is "Sge"; American astronomer Henry Norris Russell, who devised the code, had to resort to using the genitive form of the name to come up with a letter to include ('e') that was not in the name of the constellation Sagittarius. The official constellation boundaries, as set by Belgian astronomer Eugène Delporte in 1930, are defined by a polygon of twelve segments (illustrated in infobox).

Notable features

Stars

Celestial cartographer Johann Bayer gave Bayer designations to eight stars, labelling them Alpha to Theta. English astronomer John Flamsteed added the letters x, mistaken as Chi (χ), y and z to 13, 14, and 15 Sagittae in his Catalogus Britannicus. All three were dropped by later astronomers John Bevis and Francis Baily.

Bright stars
Ptolemy saw the constellation's brightest star Gamma Sagittae as marking the arrow's head, while Bayer saw Gamma, Eta, and Theta as depicting the arrow's shaft. Gamma Sagittae is a red giant of spectral type M0 III, and magnitude 3.47. With around 90% of the Sun's mass, it has a radius 54 times that of the Sun and is 575 times as bright. It is most likely on the red-giant branch of its evolutionary lifespan, having exhausted its core hydrogen and now burning it in a surrounding shell.

Delta Sagittae is the second-brightest star in the constellation and is a binary. Delta and Zeta depicted the spike according to Bayer. The Delta Sagittae system is composed of a red supergiant of spectral type M2 II that has 3.9 times the Sun's mass and 152 times its diameter and a blue-white B9.5V main sequence star that is 2.9 times as massive as the Sun. The two orbit each other every ten years. The primary and secondary are A-type stars.

In his Uranometria, Bayer depicted Alpha, Beta, and Epsilon Sagittae as the fins of the arrow. Four times as massive as the Sun, it has swollen and brightened to 20 times the Sun's diameter and 340 times its luminosity. Also of magnitude 4.38, Beta is a G-type giant located  distant from Earth. Estimated to be around 129 million years old, it is 4.33 times as massive as the Sun, and has expanded to roughly 27 times its diameter. Epsilon Sagittae is a double star whose component stars can be seen in a small telescope. With an apparent magnitude of 5.77, the main star is a 331-million-year-old yellow giant of spectral type G8 III around 3.09 times as massive as the Sun, that has swollen to  its diameter. It is  distant. The visual companion of magnitude 8.35 is 87.4 arcseconds distant, but is an unrelated blue supergiant around  distant from Earth.

Eta Sagittae is an orange giant of spectral class K2 III with a magnitude of 5.09. Located  from Earth, it has a 61.1% chance of being a member of the Hyades-Pleiades stream of stars that share a common motion through space. Theta Sagittae is a double star system, with components 12 arcseconds apart visible in a small telescope.

Variable stars

Variable stars are popular targets for amateur astronomers, their observations providing valuable contributions to understanding star behaviour. R Sagittae is a member of the rare RV Tauri variable class of star. It ranges in magnitude from 8.2 to 10.4. It is around  distant. An aging star, it has moved on from the asymptotic giant branch of stellar evolution and is on its way to becoming a planetary nebula. FG Sagittae is a "born again" star, a highly luminous star around  distant from Earth. It reignited fusion of a helium shell shortly before becoming a white dwarf, and has expanded first to a blue supergiant and then to a K-class supergiant in less than 100 years. It is surrounded by a faint (visual magnitude 23) planetary nebula, Henize 1–5, that formed when FG Sagittae first left the asymptotic giant branch.

S Sagittae is a classical Cepheid that varies from magnitude 5.24 to 6.04 every 8.38 days. It is a yellow-white supergiant that pulsates between spectral types F6 Ib and G5 Ib. Infrared bands of ionised buckminsterfullerene molecules have also been found in its spectrum. WR 124 is a Wolf-Rayet star moving at great speed surrounded by a nebula of ejected gas.

U Sagittae is an eclipsing binary that varies between magnitudes 6.6 and 9.2 over 3.4 days, making it a suitable target for enthusiasts with small telescopes. There are two component stars—a blue-white star of spectral type B8 V and an ageing star that has cooled and expanded into a yellow subgiant of spectral type G4 III-IV. They orbit each other close enough that the cooler subgiant has filled its Roche lobe and is passing material to the hotter star, and hence it is a semidetached binary system. The system is  distant. Near U Sagittae is X Sagittae, a semiregular variable ranging between magnitudes 7.9 and 8.4 over 196 days.

Located near 18 Sagittae is V Sagittae, the prototype of the V Sagittae variables, cataclysmic variables that are also super soft X-ray sources. It is expected to become a luminous red nova when the two stars merge around the year 2083, and briefly become the most luminous star in the Milky Way and one of the brightest stars in Earth's sky. WZ Sagittae is another cataclysmic variable, composed of a white dwarf that has about 85% the mass of the Sun, and low-mass star companion that has been calculated to be a brown dwarf of spectral class L2 that is only 8% as massive as the Sun. Normally a faint object dimmer than magnitude 15, it flared up in 1913, 1946 and 1978 to be visible in binoculars. The black widow pulsar (B1957+20) is the second millisecond pulsar ever discovered. It is a massive neutron star that is ablating its brown dwarf-sized companion which causes the pulsar's radio signals to attenuate as they pass through the outflowing material.

Stars with exoplanets

HD 231701 is a yellow-white main sequence star hotter and larger than the Sun, with a Jupiter-like planet that was discovered in 2007 by the radial velocity technique. It has a mass of at least 1.13 Jupiter masses. 

HAT-P-34 is a star  times as massive as the Sun with  times its radius and  times its luminosity. With an apparent magnitude of 10.4, it is  distant. A planet  times as massive as Jupiter was discovered transiting it in 2012.

15 Sagittae is a solar analog—a star similar to the Sun, with  times its mass,  times its radius and  times its luminosity. It has an apparent magnitude of 5.80. The system is estimated to be  billion years old.

Deep-sky objects
The band of the Milky Way and the Great Rift within it pass though Sagitta, with Alpha, Beta and Epsilon Sagittae marking the Rift's border. Located between Beta and Gamma Sagittae is Messier 71, a very loose globular cluster mistaken for some time for a dense open cluster.
 it was first discovered by the French astronomer Philippe Loys de Chéseaux in the year 1745 or 1746.

The Necklace Nebula—originally a close binary, one component of which swallowed the other as it expanded to become a giant star. The smaller star remained in orbit inside the larger, whose rotation speed increased greatly, resulting in it flinging its outer layers off into space, forming a ring with knots of bright gas formed from clumps of stellar material. It was discovered in 2005 and is around 2 light-years wide.

See also 
 Sagitta (Chinese astronomy)

Notes

References

External links 

 The Deep Photographic Guide to the Constellations: Sagitta
 Warburg Institute Iconographic Database (medieval and early modern images of Sagitta)
 Bayer's  Uranometria, from the Linda Hall Library digital collection.

 
Constellations
Northern constellations
Constellations listed by Ptolemy
Articles containing video clips